A groin attack is a deliberate strike to the groin area of one's opponent. The technique can be quickly debilitating due to the sensitivity of the groin area and genitalia, and is sometimes used as a self-defense technique. The technique is often banned in sports. Groin attacks have been popularized as a comedic device in various forms of media.

In sports

An attack to the groin in sports is considered to be a "low blow," not only in the literal sense, but is the origin of the metaphor as well. In a playful attack, or attack in the framework of a sport, a low blow is seen as unfair or improper  and is often considered dishonorable.

Strikes to the groin have been forbidden in boxing as far back as the Marquess of Queensberry Rules, and they are almost universally forbidden in martial arts competitions including kickboxing, and mixed martial arts. 

UFC rules dictate that a groin strike is a foul in both male and female matches, with the competitor who has received such a strike given up to five minutes to recover. The rules require male competitors to wear groin protection, but prohibit female competitors from doing so. 

Groin attacks were allowed until the 1980s in international Muay Thai boxing and are still permitted in Thailand itself, though male boxers wear cups to lessen the impact.

Direct strikes to the groin are generally considered illegal in professional wrestling as well, and unofficial rings may consider it shameful. However, in certain "hardcore" matches the rules are relaxed, and such attacks are allowed by mutual consent.

In self-defense

Groin attacks are sometimes used as a self-defense technique. The attack can allow a combatant to temporarily disable an assailant, making it easy for them to escape. When an opponent is at close range, a knee strike to the groin is easy to execute and difficult to defend against. It is often, but not always, effective.

In BDSM
Groin attacks are viewed as erotic in the context of some sexual activities, including cock and ball torture and pussy torture.

In popular culture
Groin attacks on men are the most widely known, and have been popularized as a comedic device in popular culture. In media, groin attacks are sometimes depicted as causing men to speak in a falsetto or soprano register, as well as experience strabimus. As well as Groan, Moan .  

Groin attacks on men are also the subject of an Internet meme where they are commonly called "nutshots." They have been featured in practical joke videos uploaded to websites such as YouTube. The meme sometimes also involves an accidental and comedic injury to the groin, usually as a result of falling or struck by an object.

Groin attacks on women are depicted less often in media, and are often depicted as having the same effect as a hit to anywhere else (or occasionally no effect at all). They are sometimes called "cunt-punts."

Effects

The testicles lack anatomical protection and are highly sensitive to impact.  The pain resulting from impact to the testicles travels through the spermatic plexus into the abdomen.  In extreme cases, a blow to the testicle can cause one or both of the testicles to rupture, potentially resulting in sterility.

The skin of the vulva and the clitoris are highly sensitive, making laceration injuries especially painful.

A sufficiently powerful blow to the groin could potentially fracture the pubic bone, resulting in further physical disability.

See also

 Below the belt
 Cock and ball torture
 Pussy torture

References

Banned sports tactics
Martial art techniques
Strikes (martial arts)